The British Academy Video Games Award for Performer in a Supporting Role is an award presented annually by the British Academy of Film and Television Arts (BAFTA) in honor of the best supporting performance featured in a game "from voice artistry through to motion capture".

BAFTA has honoured video game performances since the 8th British Academy Video Games Awards ceremony in 2012, with Mark Hamill winning the inaugural award for his performance as the Joker in Batman: Arkham City. From 2012 to 2019, performers in both leading and supporting roles were considered together in the merged category of British Academy Games Award for Performer but, as of the 16th British Academy Games Awards, during a reconfiguration of categories, BAFTA announced that the Performer award would be split into both Leading and Supporting categories.

The inaugural winner in the Supporting category was Martti Suosalo for his role as Ahti the Janitor in Remedy Entertainment's Control. Troy Baker has received the most nominations, with two, one for his role as Higgs in Death Stranding and one for portraying Joel in The Last of Us Part II.

The current holder of the award is Kimberly Brooks for her role as Hollis Forsythe in Psychonauts 2 which won at the 18th British Academy Games Awards in 2022.

Winners and nominees

In the following table, the years are listed as per BAFTA convention, and generally correspond to the year of game release in the United Kingdom.

Multiple wins and nominations

Performers
2 nominations
Troy Baker

Series
4 nominations
God of War Ragnarök
3 nominations
Life Is Strange
Life Is Strange 2 (2 nominations)
Life Is Strange: True Colors (1 nomination)
The Last of Us Part II

2 nominations
Marvel's Guardians of the Galaxy

References

External links
British Academy Video Games Awards official website

Performer
Awards for video game performances